The Huaca del Sol is an adobe brick pyramid built by the Moche civilization (100 AD to 800 AD) on the northern coast of what is now Peru. The pyramid is one of several ruins found near the volcanic peak of Cerro Blanco, in the coastal desert near Trujillo at the Moche Valley.  The other major ruin at the site is the nearby Huaca de la Luna, a better-preserved but smaller temple.

By 450 AD, eight different stages of construction had been completed on the Huaca del Sol.  The technique was additive; new layers of brick were laid directly on top of the old, hence large quantities of bricks were required for the construction. Archeologists have estimated that the Huaca del Sol was composed of over 130 million adobe bricks and was the largest pre-Columbian adobe structure built in the Americas.  The number of different makers' marks on the bricks suggests that over a hundred different communities contributed bricks to the construction of the Huacas.

The Huaca del Sol was composed of four main levels. The structure was expanded and rebuilt by different rulers over the course of time.  It is believed to have originally been about 50 meters in height and 340 m by 160 m at the base. Located at the center of the Moche capital city, the temple appears to have been used for ritual, ceremonial activities and as a royal residence and burial chambers. Archaeological evidence attests to these functions.

During the Spanish occupation of Peru in the early 17th century, colonists redirected the waters of the Moche River to run past the base of the Huaca del Sol in order to facilitate the looting of gold artifacts from the temple.  The operation of the hydraulic mine greatly damaged the Huaca del Sol. In total, approximately two-thirds of the structure has been lost to erosion and such looting. The remaining structure stands at a height of 41 meters (135 feet).

Looting and erosion due to El Niño continue to be major concerns to this day.

See also

 Huaca de la Luna
 History of Peru
 Pre-Inca cultures
 List of tallest structures built before the 20th century

References

Sources

 Art of the Andes, from Chavin to Inca.  Rebecca Stone-Miller, Thames and Hudson, 1995.
 The Incas and Their Ancestors: the archaeology of Peru.  Michael E. Moseley, Thames and Hudson, 1992.

External links
 www.huacas.com
 Sun and Moon Temples, Official website 
 Huaca del Sol placemarks Google Earth .kmz

Moche sites
Moche culture
Adobe buildings and structures
Archaeological sites in Trujillo, Peru
Museums in Peru
Archaeological museums in Peru
Archaeological sites in Peru